Getto or Ghetto di Jacopo (Active 1386–1405) was an Italian painter, mainly active in Pisa. He was the brother of Jacopo di Michele.

His only signed work is depiction of six saints in the Museo di San Matteo, Pisa. A Noli Me Tangere fresco, from the former church of San Felice e Regolo and acquired by the Cassa di Risparmio di Pisa (now on display in Palazzo Blu), has been attributed to Getto.

References

People from Pisa
14th-century Italian painters
Italian male painters
15th-century Italian painters
Painters from Tuscany
Year of birth unknown
Year of death unknown
1386 births